Monya may refer to:

Sergei Monia (alternate spelling: Sergey Monya) (born 1983), Russian professional basketball player
Dmitri Monya (born 1988), Russian professional ice hockey winger
Monya (character), character in comic album series Yoko Tsuno